Seneca Lake is the largest of the glacial Finger Lakes of the U.S. state of New York, and the deepest glacial lake entirely within the state. It is promoted as being the lake trout capital of the world, and is host of the National Lake Trout Derby. Because of its depth and relative ease of access, the US Navy uses Seneca Lake to perform test and evaluation of equipment ranging from single element transducers to complex sonar arrays and systems.
The lake takes its name from the Seneca nation of Native Americans. At the north end of Seneca Lake is the city of Geneva, New York, home of Hobart and William Smith Colleges and the New York State Agricultural Experiment Station, a division of Cornell University. At the south end of the lake is the village of Watkins Glen, New York, famed for auto racing (hosting Watkins Glen International racetrack) and waterfalls.

Due to Seneca Lake's unique macroclimate it is home to over 50 wineries, many of them farm wineries and is the location of the Seneca Lake AVA. (See Seneca Lake wine trail).

Description

Seneca's two main inlets are Catharine Creek at the southern end and the Keuka Lake Outlet. Seneca Lake lets out into the Seneca River/ Cayuga-Seneca Canal, which joins Seneca and Cayuga Lakes at their northern ends.

It is fed by underground springs and replenished at a rate of 328,000 gallons (1240 m³) per minute. These springs keep the water moving in a circular motion, giving it little chance to freeze over. Because of Seneca Lake's great depth its temperature remains a near-constant .

Ecology
Seneca lake has a typical aquatic population for large deep lakes in the northeast, with coldwater fish such as lake trout and Landlocked Atlantic salmon inhabiting the deeper waters, and warmwater fish such as smallmouth bass and yellow perch inhabiting the shallower areas. The lake is also home to a robust population of "sawbellies," the local term for alewife shad.

History

Seneca Lake was formed at least two million years ago by glacial carving of streams and valleys. Originally it was a part of a series of rivers that flowed northward. Around this time many continental glaciers moved into the area and started the Pleistocene glaciation also known as the Ice Age. It is presumed that the Finger Lakes were created by many advances and retreats of massive glaciers that were up to 2 miles wide.

Over 200 years ago, there were Iroquois villages on Seneca Lake's surrounding hillsides. During the American Revolutionary War, their villages, including Kanadaseaga ("Seneca Castle"), were wiped out during the 1779 Sullivan Expedition.

After the war, the Iroquois were forced to cede their land when Britain was defeated. Their millions of acres were sold and some lands in this area were granted to veterans of the army in payment for their military service. A slow stream of European-American settlers began to arrive circa 1790. Initially the settlers were without a market nearby or a way to get their crops to market. The settlers' isolation ended in 1825 with the opening of the Erie Canal.

The canal linked the Finger Lakes Region to the outside world. Steamships, barges and ferries quickly became Seneca Lake's ambassadors of commerce and trade. The former, short Crooked Lake Canal linked Seneca Lake to Keuka Lake.

Numerous canal barges sank during operations and rest on the bottom of the lake. A collection of barges at the southwest end of the lake, near the village of Watkins Glen, is being preserved and made accessible for scuba diving by the Finger Lakes Underwater Preserve Association.

Recreation

Fishing
The lake is a popular fishing destination. Fish species in the lake include lake trout, rainbow trout, brown trout, landlocked salmon, largemouth bass, smallmouth bass, northern pike, pickerel, and yellow perch.

Folklore

Sea serpent
In July 1900, newspaper reports carried reports that on the evening of 14 July 1899, the steamboat Otetiani, carrying several dozen passengers, encountered a 25-foot-long sea monster with "two rows of sharp, white teeth." The steamer is said to have given chase to the creature and deliberately rammed it at full speed. The creature was struck by the ship's paddle wheel midway between head and tail, it spine broken. It raised its four-foot-long head, then gave a gasp as it died. The ship attempted to rope the monster and tow it back to shore, but it sank to the bottom of Seneca Lake. A report sometime later in the Geneva Gazette suggested that the incident was a hoax.

Painted rocks
The painted rocks located at the southern end of the lake on the eastern cliff face depict an American flag, tee-pee, and several Native Americans. The older paintings, located on the bottom of the cliff, were said to have been drawn in 1779 after the Senecas escaped men from John Sullivan's campaign.  However, this account is questioned by historian Barbara Bell, arguing that it is unlikely that the Senecas would have returned to paint the paintings having just escaped from Sullivan's men. She suggests instead that these paintings may have been made much later, for tourists on Seneca Lake boat tours.

It is known that the more visible and prominent paintings of the Native Americans, American flag, and tee-pee were added in 1929 during the Sullivan Sesquicentennial.  There are two mistakes in these 1929 additions: firstly the Native Americans in the Seneca Region used longhouses and not tee-pees, and secondly the flag is displayed pointing to the left which is never to be done on a horizontal surface.

Seneca Guns
Seneca Lake is also the site of strange and currently unexplained cannon-like booms and shakes that are heard and felt in the surrounding area. They are known locally as the Seneca Guns, Lake Drums, or Lake Guns, and these types of phenomena are known elsewhere as skyquakes. The term Lake Guns originated in the short story "The Lake Gun" by James Fenimore Cooper in 1851. There is no explanation that takes into account sounds the Iroquois heard before Cooper's time; it is possible sonic booms have been mistaken for natural sounds in modern days.

Sampson Navy and Air Force bases
The east side of Seneca Lake was once home to a military training ground called Sampson Naval Base, primarily used during World War II. It became Sampson Air Force Base during the Korean War and was used for basic training. After Sampson AFB closed, the airfield remained as Seneca Army Airfield but was closed in 2000. The training grounds of Sampson have since been converted to a civilian picnic area called Sampson State Park.

There is still a Naval facility at Seneca Lake, the Naval Undersea Warfare Center (NUWC) Sonar test facility. A scale model of the sonar section of the nuclear submarine USS Seawolf (SSN 21) was tested during the development of this ship,  which was launched in June, 1995.

Water quality

There is a YSI EMM-2500 Buoy Platform located in the north end of Seneca Lake roughly in the center. Its coordinates are: latitude: 42°41'49.99"N, longitude: 76°55'29.93"W. The buoy has cellular modem communications and measures wind speed and direction, relative humidity, air temperature, barometric pressure, light intensity, and the water's depth and temperature, conductivity, turbidity, and chlorophyll-a levels.

The buoy was initially deployed in June 2006.

On June 30, 2022, the New York State Department of Environmental Conservation denied a request for an air permit for a natural gas power plant owned by Greenidge Generation, a bitcoin mining company, on the lake used for powering an 8,000-machine operation which the company argued had no legal basis and would challenge in court in a press statement.

Wine

Viticulture and winemaking in the area date back to the 19th century, with the foundation of the Seneca Lake Wine Company in 1866 marking the first major winery in the area. The modern era of wine production began in the 1970s with the establishment of several wineries and the passage of the New York Farm Winery Act of 1976. The region was established as an American Viticultural Area in 1988.

Seneca Lake Wine Trail hosts many events on and around the lake including the annual winter 'Deck the Halls' event, at which local wineries showcase their vintages.

Transport
The Elmira & Seneca Lake Railway opened for operation on 19 June 1900 from Horseheads, New York to Seneca Lake.

References

External links

"Test and evaluation of Seawolf class submarine at the Naval Undersea Warfare Center"
"Seneca Lake Sonar Test Facility"
"Finger Lakes Underwater Preserve Association"
 New York State Parks: Sampson State Park
 Sampson Naval Training Station Veterans Website
 Sampson Air Force Veterans Website

Seneca Lake
Lakes of Yates County, New York
Tourist attractions in Yates County, New York
Lakes of Seneca County, New York
Lakes of Schuyler County, New York
Tourist attractions in Seneca County, New York
Tourist attractions in Schuyler County, New York
Lakes of New York (state)